Richard Pribram (21 April 1847, in Prague – 7 January 1928, in Berlin) was an Austrian chemist. He was the brother of internist Alfred Pribram (1841–1912).

He studied chemistry in Prague and Munich (under Justus Liebig), later becoming an assistant of organic chemistry at the University of Leipzig. In 1872 he earned his habilitation at Prague, where he worked as a lecturer until 1874. He later taught classes at the University of Czernowitz, becoming a full professor of general and analytical chemistry in 1879. At Czernowitz he served as dean to the faculty (1883–84) and rector (1891–92).

As a chemist he conducted analyses of mineral springs in Bucovina, and with Alois Handl (1837–1915), he researched the viscosity of various organic compounds. With Neumann Wender he was co-author of Anleitung zur Prüfung und Gehaltsbestimmung der Arzneistoffe für Apotheker, Chemiker, Aerzte und Sanitätsbeamte ("Guidance on testing and assay of drugs for pharmacists, chemists, doctors and medical officers") (1893).

See also 
 Austrium

References 

Ludwig Maximilian University of Munich alumni
Scientists from Prague
1928 deaths
1847 births
Charles University alumni
Austrian chemists
Academic staff of Chernivtsi University
Rectors of Franz Joseph University (Czernowitz)
Academic staff of Leipzig University
20th-century Austrian scientists
19th-century Austrian scientists
19th-century chemists
20th-century chemists
Austrian Jews